The discography of the British girl group Sugababes consists of eight studio albums, four compilation album, four extended plays, thirty one singles (two as featured artists), two video albums and eight promotional singles. The Sugababes were formed in 1998 and, at various times, featured three vocalists from Siobhán Donaghy, Mutya Buena, Keisha Buchanan, Heidi Range, Amelle Berrabah, and Jade Ewen.

The Sugababes' debut album, One Touch, was released in November 2000 and peaked at number twenty-six on the UK chart, eventually earning gold certification. One Touch produced four singles, three of which reached the top twenty, while the album's lead single "Overload" was nominated for a BRIT Award for Best British Single. The album's sales did not meet the expectations of London Records and the group was subsequently dropped. Donaghy left the group in August 2001 and was replaced by former Atomic Kitten member Heidi Range. The group's second album Angels with Dirty Faces was released in August 2002 through Island Records. Influenced by the new wave, dance, and pop music of the 1980s, the record enjoyed success in the UK where it reached number two and went triple platinum. It produced the number one singles "Freak Like Me" and "Round Round", and nominated for Best British Album at the 2003 BRIT Awards.

Three, the Sugababes' third album, was released in October 2003. It reached number three and was certified double platinum in the UK. The album produced four singles, including the number one "Hole in the Head". The group's fourth album Taller in More Ways, released in October 2005, reached number one and went double platinum in the UK. It produced three internationally successful singles, "Push the Button", "Ugly" and "Red Dress". Shortly following the album's release, Buena left the group due to personal reasons, and was replaced by Amelle Berrabah. The group's fifth album Change was released in October 2007. The album, composed of pop and dance songs, reached number one and went platinum in the UK. Change produced three top twenty singles, including "Change", "Denial", and the UK number one "About You Now", signalling the second occasion in which the band were simultaneously number one on the UK album, single, download and airplay charts.

The group's sixth studio album, Catfights and Spotlights was released in 2008, and charted in the top ten of the UK Albums Chart. Two singles were released from the album, including "Girls" and "No Can Do", the former peaking at number three on the UK Singles Chart. The band's seventh and most recent studio album Sweet 7 was released in March 2010 featuring the lead single "Get Sexy", which peaked at number two on the UK Singles Chart; it was the last single to feature Keisha Buchanan. The second single from the album, "About a Girl", peaked at number eight in the UK, and was the first single to feature new member Jade Ewen. "Wear My Kiss", the album's third single, peaked at number seven in the UK.

On 11 May 2021, the Sugababes released a reworking of 2001 single "Run for Cover" featuring MNEK to celebrate 20 years of One Touch and plans for new music. On 24 December 2022, Sugababes surprise-released the album The Lost Tapes online. The album consisted of songs intended for their 2013 reunion album which was never released due to legal and rights issues.

Albums

Studio albums

Compilation albums

Extended plays

Singles

As lead artist

As featured artist

Promotional singles

Other charted songs

Other appearances

Music videos

Notes

References

External links
 Official website
 
 

Discographies of British artists
Pop music group discographies
Discography